Dobrowolski (feminine: Dobrowolska; plural: Dobrowolscy) is a Polish-language surname.

People 
 Andrzej Dobrowolski (1921–1990), Polish composer
 Antoni Bolesław Dobrowolski (1872–1954), Polish scientist
 Dobrowolski Island, named after him
 Ewelina Dobrowolska (born 1988), Polish-Lithuanian politician
 Franciszek Dobrowolski (1830–1896), Polish theatre director
 Gosia Dobrowolska (born 1958), Polish-Australian actress
 Jan Fryderyk Dobrowolski (born 1944), Polish composer
 Rafał Dobrowolski (born 1983), Polish athlete
 Władysław Dobrowolski (1896–1969), Polish fencer
 Valentine Semibreve de Dobrowolski (1847–1896), composer

Polish-language surnames